Megacyllene castroi is a species of beetle in the family Cerambycidae. It was described by Prosen in 1947.

References

Megacyllene
Beetles described in 1947